The Nobel Peace Prize Concert   has been held annually since 1994 on 11 December, to honour the Nobel Peace Prize laureate. The award ceremony on 10 December takes place in Oslo City Hall, while the concert has been held at Oslo Spektrum, with the attendance of the laureate and other prominent guests. The Concert is broadcast to a global audience and reaches up to 350 million households in 100 countries.

In 2015 a new distributor was announced and after 20 years at Oslo Spektrum, a change of concert venue was announced. The much larger Telenor Arena. The international entertainment giant IMG lost the job in obtaining sponsors and distribute it.
Instead the concert will be produced by the Norwegian event agency Gyro in cooperation with the television production department to Norwegian Warner Bros, the former Eyeworks.

The concert features performers from a wide range of musical genres, the exception being the year of 1995, when a classical concert was held instead. Several editions of the concert are recorded, with different lengths and content, for airing in several countries.

The hosts give descriptions of the winner's work, an interview with the winner is shown, and the winner gives a speech during the concert.

In 2018, the concert organizers announced that the show would be put on hiatus for 2018, hoping to hold a relaunched concert the following year. The official website stated, "The decision emerges from a wish to re-think the concert format and content but also reflects the challenging financial situation of the concert in recent years. Moreover, people’s media preferences have undergone radical change since the first concert in 1994. This is something the concert organizers and producers are keenly aware of as they move forward. We have struggled to maintain an appropriate level of financing and want to use the year ahead to develop a new format for the concert. Our ambition is to launch a renewed and better concert in 2019. [...] We plan to use this break to further develop the format and strengthen the financing beyond the continuing and generous support of our long term Norwegian sponsors. The firmer our financial base, the stronger our independence in choice of concert format and profile, say concert producers Odd Arvid Strømstad (Warner Bros. Norway) and Kristian Kirkvaag (Gyro)."

Laureates, hosts and artists by year
Since planning starts in January, the artists invited to the concert aren't typically connected to the winner, who is announced in October. However, a few late additions are usually made to reflect the winner. Originally, the show was hosted by Norwegian celebrities or television personalities. However, since the year 2000 hosts have with few exceptions come from the United States of America. 
The Norwegian Radio Orchestra is the main orchestra every year.

1994
Laureates Yasser Arafat, Shimon Peres and Yitzhak Rabin

Host Erik Bye

Artists
Ofra Haza
Mari Boine
Ole Edvard Antonsen
Nusrat Fateh Ali Khan
Sigvard Dagsland
Sinéad O'Connor
Sondre Bratland

1995
Laureates Joseph Rotblat and the Pugwash Conferences on Science and World Affairs

This year a concert featuring only classical works was held.

1996
Laureates Carlos Filipe Ximenes Belo and José Ramos-Horta

Host Lise Fjeldstad

Artists
Angélique Kidjo
Annbjørg Lien
Jan Garbarek / Angelite
Joan Osborne
Morten Harket performed the song "East Timor"
Solveig Kringlebotn
Sondre Bratland
Sølvguttene
Tata-Mai-Lau

1997
Laureates International Campaign to Ban Landmines (ICBL) and Jody Williams

Host Vigdís Finnbogadóttir

Artists
Anne Grete Preus
Boyz II Men
Emmylou Harris – (special wish from the Peace Prize winner)
Harry Connick, Jr.
Jewel
Mariah Carey – "My All", "Butterfly"; "One Sweet Day" with Boyz II Men
Nils Petter Molvær
Sinéad O'Connor
Sølvguttene
Youssou N'Dour

Producers
Andrew Lanter- IMG

Harry Connick Jr brought 35 musicians with him on stage, when performing at the concert in 1997.

1998
Laureates John Hume and David Trimble

Host Åse Kleveland

Artists
a-ha – "Summer Moved On", "The Sun Always Shines on TV";
Alanis Morissette – "Baba", "Uninvited", "Thank U" 
The Cranberries – "Dreams", "Promises", "Linger"
Elton John (Videoscreen) – "Your Song", "Something About The Way You Look Tonight"
Enrique Iglesias
Espen Lind – "Pop From Hell"
Hariprasad Chaurasia
James Galway with Phil Coulter
Oumou Sangaré
Pandit Shivkumar Sharma
Phil Collins – "Both Sides of the Story", "Another Day in Paradise"
Shania Twain – "You're Still the One", "Black Eyes, Blue Tears"
Sølvguttene
Willard White (replacement for Andrea Bocelli)

Producers
Andrew Lanter- IMG

At the concert in 1998, American TV network Fox, did not include A-ha's performance, which was edited out. Another performance edited out by Fox in 1998, was Norwegian artist Espen Lind's "Pop From Hell". The word "hell" was not the problem, but the following sentence: "You make me so hard/because you're a star". A Fox-producer stated it would be too much to take for the American family audience. Espen Lind was told his performance would not be edited out if he did not include the word "hard" in the song, but he would not change the lyrics. He said he did not want to let himself be controlled by a double-moralistic American family channel, and that such compromises were not acceptable for him to make.

1999
Laureate Médecins Sans Frontières

Host Claus Wiese
Voice-over: David Fishel

Artists
a1
Bryan Ferry
The Corrs
Denyce Graves
Ismaël Lô
Ladysmith Black Mambazo
Ole Edvard Antonsen with the Norwegian Radio Orchestra
Secret Garden
Sting
Tina Turner "When the heartache is over", "Whatever you need"

2000
Laureate Kim Dae-jung

Host Jane Seymour (short notice cancellation by Meryl Streep)

Artists
Bon Jovi
Bryn Terfel
Eros Ramazzotti
Femi Kuti
Lee Ann Womack
Moby
Natalie Cole
Sissel Kyrkjebø
Sumi Jo
Westlife

2001
Laureates The United Nations and Kofi Annan

Hosts Liam Neeson and Meryl Streep

Artists
a-ha – "Differences", "Hunting High and Low "
Anastacia
Barbara Hendricks
Daniela Mercury
Destiny's Child
International Children's Choir
Jan Garbarek
Kodo
Natalie Imbruglia - "Torn"
Paul McCartney- "Your Loving Flame", "Freedom"
Russell Watson
Wyclef Jean – "Redemption Song", "Wish You Were Here"
Youssou N'Dour  – "My Hope Is in You"
Norwegian Radio Orchestra conducted by Paul Bateman

The 2001 concert's closing song was "Let It Be", performed by Paul McCartney and the other artists.

2002
Laureate Jimmy Carter

Hosts Anthony Hopkins and Jessica Lange

Artists
Angélique Kidjo
Hall & Oates
Jennifer Lopez – "Jenny From The Block"
Jessye Norman
Joaquín Cortés
Josh Groban – "To Where You Are", "The Prayer" with Sissel Kyrkjebø
Laura Pausini - "E ritorno da te", "Surrender"
Mari Boine
Michelle Branch
Santana – "Adouma", "Victory is Won", "Oye Como Va"
Sissel Kyrkjebø  – "The Prayer" with Josh Groban
Suede
Willie Nelson – "Always on My Mind", "The Great Divide", "Georgia on My Mind" (special wish from the Peace Prize winner)
Norwegian Radio Orchestra conducted by Paul Bateman

The Grand Finale in 2002, performed by all the artists, was "Imagine" by John Lennon.

2003 
Laureate Shirin Ebadi

Hosts Catherine Zeta-Jones and Michael Douglas

Artists
 Aretha Franklin – "Make Them Hear You", "Wonderful"
 Angela Gheorghiu – "Muzica"
 Orchestra Baobab
 Carly Simon – Let The River Run
 The Cardigans – "For What It's Worth", "Communication"
 The Chieftains – "40 Shades of Green" with Rosanne Cash
 Craig David – "World Filled With Love", "Hidden Agenda"
 Jan Werner Danielsen – "Air"
 The Kamkars
 Lene Marlin – "Sorry", "Hope you're happy"
 Roberto Alagna – "'O sole mio"; "Come prima" with Angela Gheorghiu
 Robert Plant – "Morning Dew" with Strange Sensation
 Tim McGraw – "Please remember me", "God's child"
 Norwegian Radio Orchestra conducted by Martin Yates
 Hearts In Motion Gospel Choir – "Air" with Jan Werner Danielsen

The Grand Finale in 2003, sung by all the artists, was "Imagine". Robert Plant sang and changed the word "religion" with "division" in the sentence "Nothing to kill or die for/ And no division too".

2004 
Laureate Wangari Maathai

Hosts Oprah Winfrey and Tom Cruise

Artists
 Andrea Bocelli – "Dell'amore non-si sa", "In-canto"
 Baaba Maal
 Chris Botti – "Someone To Watch Over Me"
 Cyndi Lauper – "Time After Time"
 Diana Krall
 Joss Stone
 Patti LaBelle
 The Polyphonic Spree
 Sondre Lerche
 Suzanna Owíyo
 Tony Bennett
 Norwegian Radio Orchestra conducted by Martin Yates

The use of Tom Cruise as a host created some controversy both from people fearing it could be used to promote Scientology and from people who were unhappy with his supportive statements on the Iraq War. There was however no mention of Scientology during the concert and Cruise has stated his remarks on the war were misquoted. The Grand Finale was led by Patti LaBelle. For the third year in a row, the song chosen for the finale was John Lennon's "Imagine".

2005 
Laureates The International Atomic Energy Agency (IAEA) and Mohamed ElBaradei

Hosts Julianne Moore and Salma Hayek

Artists
 Damien Rice – "Unplayed piano", "Cold Water"
 Duran Duran – "Ordinary world", "(Reach up for the) Sunrise", "Nice"
 Gladys Knight – "Party train / Friendship Train medley", "The best thing that ever happened to me", "I've got to use my imagination", "I heard it through the grapevine", "Midnight train to Georgia"; "I heard it through the grapevine" with Bubba Knight
 Juanes – "La Camisa Negra", "Sueños"
 Katherine Jenkins – "L'amore sei tu" ("I Will Always Love You"), "One fine day"
 Katie Melua – "The closest thing to crazy", "I cried for you", "Nine million bicycles"
 Madrugada – "The Kids are on high street"; "Lift me" with Ane Brun
 Ska Cubano – "Chicago", "Ay Caramba"
 Sugababes – "Hole in the Head", "Ugly"
 Westlife – "World of our own"; "You raise me up" with Rolf Løvland and Fionnuala Sherry
 Yo-Yo Ma – "Haydn: Cello Concerto in C, third movement"
 Norwegian Radio Orchestra conducted by Martin Yates

The Grand Finale in 2005, sung by all the artists, was "Give Peace a Chance".

2006
Laureates Muhammad Yunus and Grameen Bank

Hosts Sharon Stone and Anjelica Huston

Artists
Hakim – "Eda Ba", "Ya Albi"
John Legend – "Save Room", "Used to Love U"
Lionel Richie – "Dancing on the Ceiling", "I Call It Love", "Hello", "All Night Long"
Monica Yunus (peace prize winner's daughter) – "O mio babbino caro"
Morten Abel – "Big Brother", "Hard to Stay Awake"
Nrityanchal, a group from Bangladesh (personal favorite of the Peace Prize winner) – Peacock dance
Paulina Rubio – "Ni Una Sola Palabra", "Beautiful Lie" ("Miénteme Una Vez Más")
Renée Fleming – "Vissi d'arte", "You'll Never Walk Alone"
Rihanna – "SOS", "Unfaithful"
Simply Red – "Something Got Me Started", "So Not Over You", "Stars"
Wynonna – "At Last", "Ave Maria"
Yusuf (Cat Stevens) – "Midday (Avoid Life After Dark)", "Peace Train", "Heaven/Where True Love Goes"
Norwegian Radio Orchestra conducted by Nick Ingman

The artists joined Lionel Richie on stage at the end of the show when/after he was singing "All Night Long".

2007
Laureates Al Gore and Intergovernmental Panel on Climate Change (IPCC)

Hosts Kevin Spacey (short notice cancellation by Tommy Lee Jones) and Uma Thurman

Artists
Earth, Wind & Fire – "Fantasy", "September"
Melissa Etheridge – "I Need to Wake Up", "What Happens Tomorrow"
Morten Harket – "Letters from Egypt" (with Sølvguttene) & " Movies "
Juanes – "Minas Piedras"
Junoon – "Bulleya"
Alicia Keys – "No One", "Fallin'", "Human Nature"
Annie Lennox – "Dark Road", "Sweet Dreams (Are Made of This)"
KT Tunstall – "Hold On", "Suddenly I See"
Kylie Minogue – "Can't Get You Out of My Head", "2 Hearts"
Tine Thing Helseth – trumpet opening number
Norwegian Radio Orchestra conducted by Nick Davies

2008

Laureate Martti Ahtisaari

Hosts Scarlett Johansson & Michael Caine

Artists
Iver Kleive – Overture
Robyn – "With Every Heartbeat", "Be Mine!"
Jason Mraz featuring Magne Furuholmen – "I'm Yours", "A Beautiful Mess"
The Script – "The Man Who Can't Be Moved", "We Cry"
Marit Larsen – "I've Heard Your Love Songs", "If a Song Could Get Me You"
Il Divo – "The Winner Takes It All", "Adagio", "Somewhere"
Dierks Bentley – "Free and Easy", "Feel That Fire", "Beautiful World" with Marit Larsen
Julieta Venegas – "El presente", "Algún día"
Seun Kuti & Egypt 80
Elina Vähälä – "Fantasy"
Diana Ross – "I'm Coming Out", "Where Did Our Love Go", "Baby Love", "Stop! In the Name of Love", "If We Hold on Together" (with Sølvguttene), "Do You Know Where You're Going To", "Ain't No Mountain High Enough" and "I Will Survive"
Norwegian Radio Orchestra conducted by Nick Davies

The artists joined Diana Ross on stage at the end of the show when/after she was singing "Reach Out and Touch (Somebody's Hand)".

2009

Laureate Barack Obama (did not attend the concert)

Hosts Will Smith and Jada Pinkett Smith with additional appearance by their children Jaden Smith and Willow Smith

Artists
Wyclef Jean – "Diallo", "Gunpowder" and "The Sweetest Girl"
Toby Keith – "God Love Her", "Cryin' For Me" and "American Ride"
Donna Summer – "MacArthur Park", "She Works Hard for the Money", "Smile", "No More Tears", "Bad Girls" and "Last Dance"
Luis Fonsi – "No me doy por vencido" and "Yo Te Propongo"
Amadou & Mariam – "Welcome to Mali" and "Beaux Dimanches"
Alexander Rybak – "Fairytale"
Esperanza Spalding – "Precious" and "I Know You Know" (special wish from the Peace Prize winner)
Lang Lang – Rhapsody in Blue
Natasha Bedingfield – "Pocketful of Sunshine", "Soulmate"
Westlife – "You Raise Me Up" (featuring Ragnhild Hemsing), "What About Now"
Norwegian Radio Orchestra conducted by Nick Davies and Jens Wendelboe (Donna Summer set)
Hearts In Motion Gospel Choir – featured in the finale

The Grand Finale in 2009, sung by all the artists, was Michael Jackson's "Man in the Mirror".

2010

Laureate Liu Xiaobo (absent)

Hosts Denzel Washington and Anne Hathaway

Artists 
A. R. Rahman – "Slumdog Millionaire Suite", "Jai Ho" featuring Asad Khan
Herbie Hancock – "Imagine", "Don't Give Up" with Kristina Train, India.Arie and Greg Phillinganes
India.Arie – "Imagine" and "Don't Give Up" with Herbie Hancock, "Gift of acceptance" featuring Idan Raichel
Colbie Caillat – "Bubbly", "Fallin' for You"
Florence and the Machine – "Dog Days Are Over", "Cosmic Love"
Robyn – "Jeg vet en deilig rose", "Dancing On My Own", "Indestructible"
Sivert Høyem – "Prisoner of the Road", "Into the Sea"
Barry Manilow – "Could It Be Magic", "Can't Smile Without You", "Mandy", "Copacabana", "One Voice"
Jamiroquai – "Canned Heat", "Lifeline", "Virtual Insanity"
 Idan Raichel – "Gift of Acceptance" with India.Arie
 Kristina Train – "Imagine" and "Don't Give Up" with Herbie Hancock
 Greg Phillinganes – "Imagine" and "Don't Give Up" with Herbie Hancock
 Asad Khan – "Jai Ho" with A.R. Rahman
 Ruth Potter, harp (featured in Florence and the Machine set)
Norwegian Radio Orchestra conducted by Nick Davies (featured in all artists performances)
Young Norwegian Strings – Rigaudon from the Holberg Suite
Nobel House Band
Hearts In Motion Gospel Choir (on Barry Manilow's "One Voice")

All artists performed Michael Jackson's "Man in the Mirror" as the finale to the 2010 Nobel Peace Prize Concert.

2011
Laureates Ellen Johnson Sirleaf, Leymah Roberta Gbowee and Tawakkol Karman

Hosts Helen Mirren and Rosario Dawson

Artists
Janelle Monáe – "Cold War", "I Want You Back", "Tightrope"
Angélique Kidjo (Leymah Gbowee's personal selection) – "Africa"
Evanescence – "Lost in Paradise", "Bring Me to Life"
Ahmed Fathi (Tawakkol Karman's personal selection) – "The Good Spirits"
Ellie Goulding – "Starry Eyed", "Your Song"
Jill Scott – "Hate on Me", "Golden", "He Loves Me (Lyzel In E Flat)"
Jarle Bernhoft – "C'mon Talk"
Sugarland – "Stuck Like Glue", "Tonight"
David Gray – "Fugitive"
World Youth Choir – "O Fortuna"
Miatta Fahnbulleh (Ellen Johnson Sirleaf's personal selection) – "Obaa"
Norwegian Radio Orchestra conducted by Nick Davies (featured in all artists performances)
Hearts In Motion Gospel Choir (featured in David Gray's "Fugitive" and Ahmed Fathi's "The Good Spirits")

All artists joined with Angélique Kidjo on the stage singing the song "Move On Up" as the finale to the 2011 Nobel Peace Prize Concert.

2012

Laureate European Union

Hosts Sarah Jessica Parker and Gerard Butler

Artists
Susanne Sundfør – "White Foxes"
Karpe Diem – "Påfugl" featuring Maria Mena
Laleh Pourkarim – "Some Die Young"
Jennifer Hudson – "Night of Your Life" and "I Want to Dance with Somebody" (Finale)
Kylie Minogue – "On a Night Like This", "Can't Get You Out of My Head"
Seal – "It's a Man's Man's Man's World", "Kiss from a Rose", "Crazy"
Fanfare Ciocărlia – "Huricestra"
OqueStrada – "Oxala Te Veja"
Ne-Yo – "Let Me Love You"
Il Volo, "Il Mondo", "We Are Love"
Milow – "You Don't Know", "You and me"
Maria Mena – "Påfugl" with Karpe Diem
Norwegian Radio Orchestra conducted by Nick Davies and Cliff Masterson (Kylie Minogue set) (featured in all artists performances)

2013
Laureate Organisation for the Prohibition of Chemical Weapons

Hosts Claire Danes and Aaron Eckhart

Artists
 Mary J. Blige – "Family Affair", "Just Fine", "One" (finale)
 James Blunt – "You're Beautiful", "Bonfire Heart", "No Bravery"
 Envy (aka. Nico & Vinz) – "In Your Arms", "Am I Wrong"
 Zara Larsson – "Uncover"
 Morrissey – "Satellite of Love", "People Are The Same Everywhere", "Irish Blood, English Heart"
 Jake Bugg – "Broken", "A Song About Love"
 Timbuktu feat. Vinni – "Alla Vill Till Himmelen Men Få Vill Ju Dö", "Let The Monkey Out"
 Omar Souleyman – "Salamat Galbi Bidek"
 Norwegian Radio Orchestra conducted by Nick Davies (featured in all performances)
Mosaic (Gospel Choir) (featured in Envy's "Am I Wrong", Timbuktu's "Alla vill till himmelen men ingen vill dö" and "Let the Monkey Out" and Mary J. Blige's "One")

2014
Laureates Malala Yousafzai and Kailash Satyarthi

Host Queen Latifah (also performed two songs during the show: "I Know Where I've Been" and "U.N: I.T.Y.")

Artists

 Gabrielle Leithaug – "5 Fine Frøkner", "I Believe"
 Seinabo Sey – "Younger"
 Nuno Bettencourt – "More Than Words" with Steven Tyler
 Steven Tyler – "Dream On", "Livin' On the Edge", "More than Words"
 Rahat Fateh Ali Khan – "Medley", "Aao Parhao"
 Laura Mvula – "Sing to the Moon", "That's Alright"
 Girls of the World (Juliana Joya, Emily Anne, and Carmen Amare) – "I Am Malala"
 Amjad Ali Khan – "Raga For Peace"
 Bolly Flex Dancers – "Jai Ho", "Chaiya Chaiya", "Nagada Sang Dhol", "One Two Three Four Get"
 Norwegian Radio Orchestra conducted by Nick Davies (featured in all performances)
Mosaic (Gospel Choir) (featured in Queen Latifah's "I Know Where I've Been", Gabrielle Leithaug's "I Believe", Steven Tyler's "Dream on", Girls of the World's "I Am Malala" and Rahat Fateh Ali Khan's "Aao Parhao")

Much of the concert of 2014 was influenced by Bollywood performances.

2015
Laureates Tunisian National Dialogue Quartet

Hosts Jay Leno (main program), Derek Muller (YouTube backstage host)

Artists

 A-ha – "Scoundrel Days", "The Sun Always Shines on TV", "Stay on These Roads", "Sycamore Leaves", "Take On Me Remix" with Kygo
 Aurora – "Murder Song (5, 4, 3, 2, 1)", "Half the World Away", "Runaway"
 Kygo – "Stole the Show" feat Parson James, "Stay" feat Maty Noyes, "Firestone" feat Kurt Nilsen, "Take On Me Remix" feat. A-ha
 Jason Derulo – "Cheyenne", "Want To Want Me"
 Emel Mathlouthi – "Kelmti Horra (My Word Is Free)"
 MØ – "New Year's Eve", "Lean On"
 Parson James – "Stole the Show" with Kygo
 Maty Noyes – "Stay" with Kygo
 Kurt Nilsen – "Firestone" with Kygo
 Norwegian Radio Orchestra (featured in all performances)
 Mosaic Gospel Choir (featured in Jason Derulo and Emel Mathlouthi sets and "Take On Me" finale)

2016
Laureate President of Colombia Juan Manuel Santos for his peace negotiation efforts with FARC

Host Conan O'Brien (also performed a short "traditional Norwegian song" based on Jørn Hoel's "Har en drøm" with the orchestra after Halsey's set)

Artists
 Frøder – "Over the Sea"
 Halsey – "Castle", "Colors"
 Highasakite – "Golden Ticket", "Lover, Where Do You Live?"
 Icona Pop – "All Night", "I Love It", "Brightside"
 Juanes – "A Dios le Pido", "Fuego", "La Camisa Negra"
 Marcus & Martinus – "Without You", "Bae"
 Sting – "Fragile", "One Fine Day", "Message in a Bottle", "Every Breath You Take"
 Norwegian Radio Orchestra (featured in all performances)
 Mosaic Gospel Choir (background vocals in Icona Pop and Halsey sets)

2017
Laureate 
 International Campaign to Abolish Nuclear Weapons

Host 
 David Oyelowo

Artists
 John Legend – "What's Going On", "Penthouse", "Love Me Now", "All of Me", "Glory", "God Only Knows" with Zara Larsson
 Sigrid Raabe – "Strangers", "Dynamite",
 Zara Larsson – "Lush Life", "Symphony", "God Only Knows" with John Legend
 Matoma, "One in a Million", "Slow", "False Alarm"
 Lukas Graham – "Funeral", "7 Years"
  – "One in a Million" with Matoma
 Shy Martin – "Slow" with Matoma
 Becky Hill – "False Alarm" with Matoma
 Le Petit Cirque – "Hero"
 Norwegian Radio Orchestra conducted by Nick Davies (featured in all performances)
 Nobel House Band (featured in all performances)
 Mosaic Gospel Choir, SiNoRi and Elitekoret (featured in select performances)

One of the surviving Hibaku pianos, a series of pianos that were successfully restored following the Hiroshima and Nagaski atomic bombings in 1945, was featured during the event. It was played by John Legend during his and Zara Larsson's duet. This was the last concert before a hiatus was announced in 2018.

2018
Laureate 
 Denis Mukwege and Nadia Murad

No regular Nobel Peace Prize Concert was held in 2018, as the organizers decided to look at the event and make changes. An alternative concert was planned for 9 December 2018. It was estimated that the original Nobel Peace Prize concert will appear again in a different format in 2019, however this has not proven to be the case.

Hosts: Kåre Magnus Bergh and Silje Nordnes

Artists for alternative concert:
Eivind Buene
Eva Weel-Skram
Kurt Nilsen 
Christel Alsos
Amanda Delara
Fargespill
Freddy Kalas
Matoma
Vamp
Wenche Myhre
Ella Marie Hætta Isaksen
D.D.E.
Julie Bergan

International broadcasters

References

External links

 2017 Nobel Peace Prize Concert on Official Nobel Peace Prize Concert YouTube Channel
 The Nobel Peace Prize Concert
 
 
 
 
 
 Pictures from the concert (2005) at Dagbladet
 Pictures from the concert (2004) at Dagbladet

Concert
1994 establishments in Norway
Concerts
Recurring events established in 1994
Tribute concerts
Annual events in Norway